The 1939–40 NCAA football bowl games were the final games of the 1939 college football season and featured five games, all of which had been held the previous season. All five bowls were played on January 1, 1940. The national championship was split by Texas A&M and USC.

Poll rankings

The below table lists top teams (per the AP Poll taken after the completion of the regular season), their win–loss records (prior to bowl games), and the bowls they later played in.

 The Big Ten Conference did not allow its members to participate in bowl games until the 1947 Rose Bowl.

Bowl schedule

Game recaps

Rose Bowl

Sugar Bowl

Orange Bowl

Cotton Bowl Classic

Sun Bowl

References